Then and Now was David Cassidy's 16th solo album, released in 2002. It became a big hit in the UK, where it reached #5 in the album charts and ultimately achieved Platinum sales status. It contained new recordings of songs previously released in other albums.

The US version of the album moved away from the emphasis on David Cassidy's UK music career and featured a different track listing, one that was more reflective of his hits in the USA. Gone were the songs "Daydreamer", "I Write the Songs", "Some Kind Of A Summer", "If I Didn't Care" and "The Last Kiss". These were replaced with updated versions of Cassidy's recordings of "No Bridge I Wouldn't Cross (Young & Gifted Mix)" and The Partridge Family theme "C'mon, Get Happy" plus a new recording of the song "Do You Believe In Magic" which David had also performed in a Christmas television advertisement for the Mervyn's department store. The different versions of this album ensured both were eagerly sought after by fans worldwide.

Track listing
 "I Think I Love You"
 "Could It Be Forever"
 "How Can I Be Sure"
 "I Woke Up In Love This Morning"
 "Daydreamer"
 "I Can Feel Your Heartbeat"
 "It's One of Those Nights (Yes Love)"
 "I Write the Songs"
 "Rock Me Baby"
 "Some Kind Of A Summer"
 "Looking Through the Eyes of Love"
 "I'll Meet You Halfway"
 "If I Didn't Care"
 "Cherish"
 "The Last Kiss"
 "Ain't No Sunshine"
 "Lyin' To Myself"
 "Cry"
 "No Bridge I Wouldn't Cross"
 "Sheltered In Your Arms"
 "Ricky's Tune"
 "Could It Be Forever (Feat. Hear'Say)

Personnel
Musicians:
Drums - Mike Bradley, Hal Blaine
Bass - Steve Pearce, Max Bennett
Piano/Keyboards - Pete Murray
Fender Rhodes - Michael Smith
Guitars - Hugh Burns, Fridrick Karlsson, Jimmy McIntosh, Dennis Budimir, Louie Shelton
Percussion - Frank Ricotti, Gary Coleman
Piano Accordion - Eddie Hession
Harmonica - Brenden Power
Harpsichord - Alexander Skeaping
Recorder - Paul Fawcus
Violins: Harvey De Souza, Laurence Jackson, Darrell Kok, Jan Schmolk, Ralph De Souza, Simon Smith, Sarah Ewins, Steve Morris
Viola: Bob Smissen, Tim Grant
Cello: Jo Knight, William Schofield

Woodwind:
Saxophone and Flute - Paul Fawcus, Scott Garland

Brass:
Trumpet and Flugal - Pat White, Mark Cumberland
Trombone - Dennis Rollins

Background vocals:
David Cassidy - Background vocals on "Ain't No Sunshine"
Ted Carfrae - Harmony vocal on "I Write The Songs"
 Mae McKenna, Janet Mooney, Lance Ellington, Phil Nicholl, Candace Davis Martin, Lisa Mayer, John Bahlor, Tom Bahlor, Randy Crenshaw, Jackie Ward

References

David Cassidy albums
2001 compilation albums